Shaylon Kallyson Cardozo (born 27 April 1997), simply known as Shaylon, is a Brazilian professional footballer who currently plays for Atlético Goianiense. Mainly an attacking midfielder, he can also play as a full-back.

Club career 
In December 2016, São Paulo FC paid R$500,000 for Shaylon to Chapecoense, and he signed a contract with Tricolor until 2021. Promoted to the first team the following January, he impressed during the pre-season.

On 8 January 2019, Bahia announced that they had signed Shaylon on a season-long loan deal from São Paulo.

Honours
Bahia
Campeonato Baiano: 2019

São Paulo
Campeonato Paulista: 2021

Atlético Goianiense
Campeonato Goiano: 2022

References

External links

1997 births
Living people
Brazilian footballers
Association football midfielders
Campeonato Brasileiro Série A players
Campeonato Brasileiro Série B players
São Paulo FC players
Esporte Clube Bahia players
Goiás Esporte Clube players
Atlético Clube Goianiense players
Brazil under-20 international footballers
Brazil youth international footballers